"Mi sento bene" is a song by Italian singer Arisa. It was written by Arisa, Matteo Buzzanca, Lorenzo Vizzini and Alessandra Flora.

It was released by Sugar Music on 6 February 2019 as the lead single from her sixth studio album Una nuova Rosalba in città. The song was Arisa's entry for the Sanremo Music Festival 2019, where it placed eighth in the grand final.

Music video
The music video of "Mi sento bene" was shot in the Brera district in Milan.

Track listing

Charts

References

2019 singles
2019 songs
Arisa songs
Sanremo Music Festival songs